Steven Wayne Schrenk (born November 20, 1968) is an American former professional baseball pitcher. He played two seasons in Major League Baseball (MLB) for the Philadelphia Phillies.

Career
He was drafted by the Chicago White Sox in the 4th round of the 1987 amateur draft. He is currently the pitching coach for the Syracuse Mets.

Schrenk won three games in the major leagues, all with the Phillies. On August 4, 1999, he picked up his only major league save during a 4-1 Phillies victory over the Marlins.

He was formerly Pitching Coach for the Gulf Coast League Phillies as well as for the Phillies' Class A affiliate team, New Jersey’s Lakewood BlueClaws, and the Class AA affiliate, the Reading Phillies, and was the manager/coach of the Canberra Cavalry (Canberra, Australian Capital Territory) in the Australian Baseball League for the 2011 season. In 2015, he returned to the Philadelphia Phillies organization as a pitching coach for the High-A Clearwater Threshers. He was promoted back to the AA Reading Phillies for the 2016 season. In early 2017, he helped coach the pitching staff for the Granville Blue Aces, a high school in Granville, Ohio, from January until late February 2017.

Schrenk was named as the pitching coach for the Reading Fightin Phils of the 2018 season.

Steve and his wife, Jennefer, launched their business, Pitching Coach Pro, on July 1, 2017.

References

External links

1968 births
Living people
Philadelphia Phillies players
Major League Baseball pitchers
Baseball coaches from Illinois
Baseball players from Illinois
Gulf Coast White Sox players
South Bend White Sox players
Sarasota White Sox players
Birmingham Barons players
Nashville Sounds players
Rochester Red Wings players
Pawtucket Red Sox players
Scranton/Wilkes-Barre Red Barons players
Sacramento River Cats players
Charlotte Knights players
People from Great Lakes, Illinois
Minor league baseball coaches